Saint Alan of Lavaur (French: Alain or Élan de Lavaur) is the saint to whom Lavaur Cathedral (Tarn, France) is dedicated. His feast day is 25 November.

Nothing is known of this saint, whose cult is attested to Lavaur. He is assumed to be a bishop and dated to the 7th century, but there is very little if any corroboration available, and it has been suggested that Alan of Lavaur may be nothing more than a pale reflection of the well-known Amand of Maastricht.

References

Sources and external links
 Martyr-et-Saint.com: Alain de Lavaur 

7th-century Frankish saints